The Badsey Brook, also known as the Broadway Brook, is a small brook that flows through Worcestershire, England. It is a lower tributary of the River Avon, which it joins near Offenham upstream of Evesham. Its principal tributary is the Bretforton Brook.

Course
It rises on the flanks of the Cotswold Hills near Snowshill, and flows in a north-westerly direction through Broadway, and Childswickham before turning north and passing Wickhamford where it is crossed by the A44.  The brook is then joined by a couple of minor tributaries, before flowing through Badsey then Aldington where it meets the Bretforton Brook. Turning north-west, it flows past Offenham Cross where it is bridged by the B5410, to join the Warwickshire Avon south of Offenham.

Hydrology
The flow of the Badsey Brook has been measured, in its lower reaches at Offenham since 1968. The gauging station was initially a flume, later changed to a weir. Land use within the basin is mainly agricultural, consisting of arable, horticulture and grassland with some woodland.

Floods
The Badsey Brook along with the Avon and its other tributaries was badly affected by the 2007 floods. To help prevent flooding in the future a flood storage area is planned to be constructed in Broadway.

See also
List of rivers of England

References

External links
Badsey Brook water levels at Offenham

Rivers of Worcestershire
1Badsey